This is a very incomplete list of Gaelic footballers who have played at senior level for the Donegal county team.

List of players

A–L
 Neil Gallagher: Until 2017

 Rory Kavanagh: Until 2017

 Karl Lacey: 2004–2017: 65 championship appearances

M
 Colm McFadden: 173 appearances, until 2016

 Eamon McGee: 12 years, until 2016

 Neil McGee: 2005–2022: 195 appearances

 Frank McGlynn: 14 years, until 2019

 Paddy McGrath: 12 years, until 2021

 Leo McLoone: 109 appearances, until 2019

 Michael Murphy: 2007–2022

N–Z
 Christy Toye: Until 2017

 David Walsh: Until 2017

References

Players
 
Lists of inter-county Gaelic football players